Bela submarginata is a species of sea snail, a marine gastropod mollusk in the family Mangeliidae.

Description
The length of the shell attains 8 mm, its diameter 3.5 mm.

Distribution
Fossils of this marine species have been found in the Vienna Basin (Hörnes, 1856) and in Ukraine (Friedberg, 1912)

References

External links
 Bellardi, 1847 Monografia delle Pleurotome fossili del Piemonte. Royal Printing 1847
 Fossilshells.nl: image of Bela submarinata

submarginata
Gastropods described in 1847